Veronica Monet (born April 1, 1960) is an American author and activist for sex worker rights. Her early activism focused on debunking stereotypes about sex workers and advocating the decriminalization of all sex work. From 1989 to 2004, she was a high-end escort and courtesan. Monet's later work focuses on anger management, healing shame, and helping couples integrate their sexuality with their spirituality.

Early life and education
Veronica Monet was born to working-class parents in the rural town of Prairie City, Oregon. She was homeschooled and did not participate in public education until entering college in 1978 when she was granted Honors at Entrance at Oregon State University. In 1979, Monet left the religious denomination she was raised in, and in 1982 she graduated from Oregon State University with honors with a Bachelor of Science in Psychology and a minor in Business Administration.

In her first seven years after graduating, Monet was employed as an office manager, department manager, and marketing representative. She experienced on-the-job sexual harassment, as well as gender pay discrimination, and these negative experiences would influence her subsequent work trajectory.

Monet's early adult life was complicated by a severe addiction to drugs and alcohol that led her to a twelve-step program in 1985. She has remained clean and sober ever since and attributes her long-term sobriety to the twelve-step programs and ongoing therapy.

Career
Monet became an escort in 1989, after four years of sobriety, and worked as a clean and sober high-end escort for fifteen years.
Throughout her escorting career, Monet was married and helped to raise her husband's two young children.  

In the Fall of 2000, the Kinsey Institute established The Veronica Monet Collection.

Academics in the field of psychology have referenced Monet's expertise on the dynamics of sexual shame and porn addiction. She is cited in the late Christopher Kennedy Lawford's Recover to Live: Kick Any Habit Manage Any Addiction (pages 166–167), and Stanford professor Philip Zimbardo's Man (Dis)Connected (page 223).

Her first book Sex Secrets of Escorts was published by Penguin in 2005.

Monet became a Certified Sexologist through the American College of Sexologists in 2007 and an Anger management Specialist through Century Anger Management. She is also a graduate of San Francisco Sex Information and now works as a relationship therapist helping people heal trauma and shame.

Selected works

Books

References

American sexologists
Women sexologists
1960 births
American sex educators
Living people
Sex worker activists in the United States
Writers from California
21st-century American women writers
21st-century American non-fiction writers
American women non-fiction writers
Activists from California
People from Grant County, Oregon